Tales ( Ghesse-ha) is a 2014 Iranian drama film directed by Rakhshan Bani-E'temad. It contains seven tales about different people. It was selected to compete for the Golden Lion at the 71st Venice International Film Festival, where it won the award for Best Screenplay. It was also screened in the Contemporary World Cinema section at the 2014 Toronto International Film Festival.

Cast
 Habib Rezaei
 Mohammad Reza Forutan
 Mehraveh Sharifinia
 Golab Adineh
 Mehdi Hashemi
 Babak Hamidian
 Peyman Moaadi

References

External links
 

2014 films
2014 drama films
Iranian drama films
2010s Persian-language films